The Billings-Burns was an English automobile built only in 1900 in Coventry.  This voiturette designed by E. D. Billings was powered by a  hp De Dion single-cylinder engine mounted in the open at the front of the car. The Burns part of the name came from its intended seller - a Mr. J. Burns based in London.

See also
 List of car manufacturers of the United Kingdom

References
 David Burgess Wise, The New Illustrated Encyclopedia of Automobiles.

Defunct motor vehicle manufacturers of England
Coventry motor companies
Defunct companies based in the West Midlands (county)